John Carter Farmstead is a historic farmhouse and bank barn located at Youngstown in Niagara County, New York. It consists of a brick dwelling constructed in 1858 in the Italianate style and a brick bank barn, constructed in 1857.  The farm ceased operation in 1996.

It was listed on the National Register of Historic Places in 2007.

References

Houses on the National Register of Historic Places in New York (state)
Italianate architecture in New York (state)
Houses completed in 1858
Houses in Niagara County, New York
National Register of Historic Places in Niagara County, New York